The Clifford Paterson Medal and Prize is awarded by the Institute of Physics. It was established in 1981 and named after Clifford Copland Paterson. The prize is awarded each year for exceptional early career contributions to the application of physics in an industrial or commercial context. The medal is bronze and is accompanied by a prize of £1000 and a certificate.

Recipients 
List of medallists:

See also
 Institute of Physics Awards
 List of physics awards
 List of awards named after people

References 

Awards established in 1981
Awards of the Institute of Physics
Physics awards